UFC Fight Night: dos Santos vs. Tuivasa (also known as UFC Fight Night 142) was a mixed martial arts event produced by the Ultimate Fighting Championship that was held on 2 December 2018 at Adelaide Entertainment Centre in Adelaide, South Australia.

Background 
The event was the second that the promotion has contested in Adelaide, following UFC Fight Night: Miocic vs. Hunt in May 2015.

A heavyweight bout between former UFC Heavyweight Champion Junior dos Santos and Tai Tuivasa served as the event headliner.

The Ultimate Fighter: United States vs. United Kingdom lightweight winner Ross Pearson was expected to face Joseph Duffy at the event. However, Pearson announced on 7 November that he was out of the bout due to a broken nose and subsequent surgery to correct the injury. He was replaced by promotional newcomer Damir Ismagulov, but Duffy pulled out of  citing a rib injury. Ismagulov then faced fellow newcomer Alex Gorgees.

Ashkan Mokhtarian was scheduled to face promotional newcomer Kai Kara-France at the event. However, on 20 November, Mokhtarian pulled out of the fight citing injury. He was replaced by Elias Garcia.

Luke Jumeau was scheduled to face Geoff Neal at the event. However, it was reported on  9 November 2018 that Jumeau pulled from the card due to injury, resulting cancellation of the bout by the UFC official.

Results

Bonus awards
The following fighters were awarded $50,000 bonuses:
Fight of the Night: Kai Kara-France vs. Elias Garcia
Performance of the Night: Maurício Rua and Sodiq Yusuff

See also
 List of UFC events
 2018 in UFC
 List of current UFC fighters

References 

UFC Fight Night
2018 in mixed martial arts
2018 in Australian sport
Mixed martial arts in Australia
Sport in Adelaide
December 2018 sports events in Australia